Annunciation School is a historic parochial school building located at Buffalo in Erie County, New York.  It was built in 1928 and is an "I" shaped brick structure representative of standardized, modestly sized school buildings of the period. It was operated by the Sisters of St. Mary of Namur.  The school was closed as a parish school in 1988. It was home to the Catholic Academy of West Buffalo until 2005 and was converted to apartments in 2009–2010.

It was listed on the National Register of Historic Places in 2008.

References

External links
Catholic Academy of West Buffalo website

Schools in Buffalo, New York
Christianity in New York (state)
Neoclassical architecture in New York (state)
School buildings completed in 1928
School buildings on the National Register of Historic Places in New York (state)
National Register of Historic Places in Buffalo, New York
1928 establishments in New York (state)